George Bazeley Scurfield was an English author, poet, and politician. He was born on 19 March 1920 in Leicestershire, England, and died on 15 December 1991 in Norwich, England. He married Cecilia Hopkinson in 1947 at Cambridge, England. They had five children, including their son the actor, Matthew Scurfield, and daughters; Sarah, Lucy, Poly and Sophy.

World War II 

During World War II, George Scurfield served as an officer with the Royal Artillery in the Middle East. He was awarded the Military Cross for his wartime services in the Far East. This military decoration is awarded to officers of the British Army in recognition of an act or acts of exemplary gallantry during active operations against the enemy.

Politics 

In the 1960s Scurfield entered municipal politics. He twice ran in Cambridge City Council, England elections as a Labour Party candidate. First in Market Ward, in May 1962 when he came in 3rd, losing to the Liberal candidate, Peter Calvert. In May 1963 Scurfield was elected to City Council in Petersfield, where he served through 1965. In September 1967 Scurfield again ran for City Council in Cambridge, placing second to the Conservative candidate, David Lane. He was the Labour Candidate for Cambridge in the 1970 General Election.

Author 

George Scurfield, with his wife Cecilia, wrote two charming and useful works on home baking. These books have become cook book classics, and both remain in print to this day. The first, Home Baked, about the process of hand baking bread, was originally published in 1956. The companion volume, Home-Made Cakes and Biscuits, first published in 1975, is equally engaging and practical.

Published poems 

Poets of Tomorrow, Second Selection (containing five poems by George Scurfield), published by Cambridge Poetry (Hogarth Press, 1940).
The Song of a Red Turtle, a book of poems published by Timbimuttu (London, 1941), 19 pages.
"Brother If You Could See Me Now", Seven Magazine of People's Writing (April - June, 1944)
"The Colonel", Seven Magazine of People's Writing (July - September, 1944)
"Evening", Seven Magazine of People's Writing (October - December, 1944
"Song and Dance" published in "The War Decade: An Anthology of the 1940s" by Andrew Sinclair, 1989 (page 34)

George Scurfield is referenced in Tambittu's Poetry in Wartime by H.M. Klein, an anthology of war poetry.

Novels 

The Bamboo House, published by Michael Joseph Ltd. (London, 1950).
Alone With Our Day, published by Michael Joseph Ltd. (London, 1952).

Non-fiction 

A Stickful of Nonpareil, with illustrations by Edward Ardizzone, published by Cambridge University Press, 1956. This 58-page book, (15 illustrations in the text) contained reminiscence of sixty years at the Cambridge University Press, and was printed in a limited edition of only 500 copies for presentation at Christmas.
Gardening for Fun by George Scurfield, published 1959.
Home Baked, A Little Book of Bread Recipes, by George and Cecilia Scurfield, Illustrated by Nora Kay. (1959), 86 pages.
Home-Made Cakes and Biscuits, by George and Cecilia Scurfield.
New York Times Menu Cook Book, by George and Cecilia Scurfield, published by H&R (New York, 1966).
Fakenham and Folkestone Etcetera, published by The Larks Press, 1988, 356 pages.
The Bitter Mangoes, memoirs of his years at St John's and his wartime service in the Far East for which he was awarded the Military Cross, 1938–45. Written in 1991. 101 pages.

References

British History On-Line

1920 births
Military personnel from Leicestershire
People from Leicestershire
Recipients of the Military Cross
1991 deaths
Royal Artillery officers
British Army personnel of World War II
20th-century English novelists
20th-century English poets